PALAIOS is a bimonthly academic journal dedicated to the study of the impact of life on Earth history, combining the fields of palaeontology and sedimentology.  It has been published by the Society for Sedimentary Geology since its inception in 1986.  Although not an acronym, the title PALAIOS is capitalized.

References 

Geology journals
Paleontology journals
Publications established in 1986
Bimonthly journals